The tennis tournament at the 2009 Southeast Asian Games was held from December 11 to December 18 in Vientiane of Laos. The men's and women's tournament have no age limit.

Medal summary

Medalists

Team

Men's team

Overview

Gold-medal match

Women's team

Overview

Gold-medal match

Singles

Men's singles

Women's singles

Doubles

Men's doubles

Women's doubles

Mixed doubles

 
2009 Southeast Asian Games events
2009 Southeast Asian Games